The Ministry of Foreign Affairs, International Cooperation, and Francophone Affairs is a ministry of the Government of Equatorial Guinea. The current Minister is Simeón Oyono Esono Angue, appointed in 2018.

List of ministers

This is a list of Ministers of Foreign Affairs and International Cooperation of Equatorial Guinea:

1968–1969: Atanasio Ndongo Miyone
1969–1971: Francisco Macías Nguema
1971–1979: Bonifacio Nguema Esono Nchama 
1979–1981: Florencio Mayé Elá
1981–1983: Marcos Mba Ondo
1983–1989: Marcelino Nguema Onguene
1989–1992: Santiago Eneme Ovono
1992–1993: Benjamín Mba Ekua Mikó
1993–1999: Miguel Oyono Ndong Mifumu
1999–2003: Santiago Nsobeya
2003–2012: Pastor Micha Ondó Bile
2012–2018: Agapito Mba Mokuy
2018–present: Simeón Oyono Esono Angue

See also
Foreign relations of Equatorial Guinea
Equatorial Guinea
Index of Equatorial Guinea–related articles

References

Foreign Affairs and International Cooperation
Equatorial Guinea